Marta Domachowska (born 16 January 1986) is a former tennis player from Poland.

She was ranked world No. 37 in singles (2006) and No. 62 in doubles (2006), and reached 2008 Australian Open fourth round in singles and won 2006 Canberra International in doubles with Roberta Vinci. She also reached three WTA Tour singles finals at the 2004 Korea Open (lost to Maria Sharapova), 2005 Internationaux de Strasbourg (lost to Anabel Medina Garrigues) and 2006 U.S. National Indoor Tennis Championships (lost to Sofia Arvidsson). She was 2003 Australian Open finalist in girls' singles, represented Poland at the 2008 Summer Olympics and was member of Poland Fed Cup team. Domachowska was the best female Polish tennis player after Magdalena Grzybowska's retirement and before Agnieszka Radwańska's successes.

Junior career
Marta started playing tennis at age seven, and reached the semifinals of the Australian Open Junior Championships in 2003.

Professional career

2001–2006
In her sole appearance at a WTA Tour tournament in 2001, as an unranked wildcard in Sopot qualifying, she lost in the first round. 2002 marked her second Tour appearance, as an unranked wildcard in Warsaw. During the year she reached the doubles semifinals in Sopot and won first her first two ITF singles titles along with her first doubles title. She debuted on WTA rankings on May 20 at No. 745 and amassed a 29–12 ITF singles record (finished as No. 356) and 9–7 doubles record. She again accepted a wildcard at Warsaw, and also at Sopot in 2003, where she won the first round of both. She won her third singles title and finished the season ranked No. 244 in singles.

In 2004, she won two more ITF titles and reached a WTA tournament final in Seoul. She defeated Anna Smashnova to reach the semifinals in Sopot, and reached the quarterfinals in Casablanca. She made her debut in the top 100 (at No. 100) on 27 September 2004. Even though she failed to qualify for the French Open, Wimbledon and US Open, she compiled a 42–20 singles record and 12–9 doubles record, finishing the season ranked No. 74 in singles.

2005 was the best year for Domachowska results-wise. She was runner-up in the Tier-III tournament in Strasbourg and reached the semifinals in Beijing, a Tier II event. She made her debut in the main draw of all four majors and made her debut in the top 50 (at No. 48) on June 6. She was runner-up in two doubles tournaments. Although, she had to withdraw from Hyderabad and Memphis after spraining her right shoulder. Her record for the year was 24–26 in singles (finishing the year No. 60) and 14–16 in doubles.

She won her first WTA title in 2006 with (Roberta Vinci) in a tournament in Canberra. She reached a singles final in Memphis and achieved a new singles career of No. 37 on April 3. She and Sania Mirza finished runner-up in Cincinnati, and with Marion Bartoli, reached the semi finals in Stanford. But she failed to advance past the first round in all four Grand Slams, and withdrew the Charleston, and Bali due to injuries. Poor results in Beijing and Seoul resulted in her finishing the year at No. 90.

2007–2015
After not playing Memphis in 2007, her ranking dropped to No. 166. As a result, she played multiple ITF-level tournaments, reaching the semifinals in one instance. She managed to qualify for the Seoul and Stockholm WTA tournaments, but failed to qualify for nine WTA events (including two majors), and lacked a win at all in Grand Slams that year. As the world No. 179, and as a qualifier, she won a $100,000 tournament in Poitiers, defeating Anna Lapushchenkova. It was her first singles title since 2003 and the biggest tournament win in her career. She won an ITF doubles title in Rome, and finished No. 143 in singles and No. 240 in doubles for the year.

In the 2008 Australian Open, she achieved her best grand slam result, reaching the fourth round, before she lost to Venus Williams. Due to this result, Domachowska returned to the top 100 (at No. 82). Domachowska also represented Poland in the singles draw at the 2008 Summer Olympics in Beijing, where she lost in the first round. She finished year at No. 56.

In 2009 in singles, she lost in the first round of all four Grand Slam tournaments, including the US Open as a qualifier. Domachowska, however, did manage to reach the singles quarterfinals of Istanbul.

In March 2013, she posed for the Polish edition of Playboy.

In December 2015, she retired from professional tennis. She later went into coaching assistant activities, becoming the hitting partner of Caroline Wozniacki in 2014.

2022: Possible comeback
In late 2021, it was announced by the International Tennis Federation that Domachowska would be eligible to compete again from January 2022.

Personal life
Marta was born to Barbara and Wiesław and currently resides in Podkowa Leśna, Poland. She has an older sister, Magdalena. Domachowska speaks Polish, English, Russian and Spanish. Other than tennis, she enjoys sports such as football and swimming.

She has been in a relationship with Polish tennis player Jerzy Janowicz  since 2013. They announced her first pregnancy on December 24, 2018, via Instagram and she gave birth to their son Filip Janowicz on January 1, 2019.

WTA career finals

Singles: 3 (3 runner-ups)

Doubles: 5 (1 title, 4 runner-ups)

ITF Circuit finals

Singles: 14 (8–6)

Doubles: 10 (5–5)

Grand Slam singles performance timeline

References

External links

 
 
 Official website

1986 births
Living people
Tennis players from Warsaw
Polish female tennis players
Tennis players at the 2008 Summer Olympics
Olympic tennis players of Poland
21st-century Polish women